Lemahabang Station (LMB) is a class III railway stasiun located in Simpangan, North Cikarang, Bekasi Regency. The station, which is located at an altitude of +16 m, is included in the Operation Area I Jakarta. The name of this station comes from the hamlet where this station is located. This station is opposite the market and across Jl. Pantura (Pantai Utara).

Services
The following is a list of train services at the Lemahabang Station.

Passenger services 
 KAI Commuter

Freight services 
 Container transport, to Jakarta (and JICT Tanjung Priok) and to Cikarang Dry Port

References

External links 
 

bekasi Regency
railway stations in West Java
railway stations opened in 1887
1880s establishments in the Dutch East Indies